Hymenidium is a genus of flowering plants belonging to the family Apiaceae.

Its native range is Central Asia to China and Himalaya.

Species:

Hymenidium album 
Hymenidium amabile 
Hymenidium apiolens 
Hymenidium astrantioideum 
Hymenidium benthamii 
Hymenidium bicolor 
Hymenidium brunonis 
Hymenidium chloroleucum 
Hymenidium corydalifolium 
Hymenidium cristatum 
Hymenidium davidii 
Hymenidium decurrens 
Hymenidium delavayi 
Hymenidium densiflorum 
Hymenidium dentatum 
Hymenidium foetens 
Hymenidium giraldii 
Hymenidium hedinii 
Hymenidium heracleifolium 
Hymenidium heterosciadium 
Hymenidium hookeri 
Hymenidium huzhihaoi 
Hymenidium ladyginii 
Hymenidium lhasanum 
Hymenidium lindleyanum 
Hymenidium linearilobum 
Hymenidium macrochlaenum 
Hymenidium mieheanum 
Hymenidium nubigenum 
Hymenidium pachycaule 
Hymenidium pilosum 
Hymenidium pulszkyi 
Hymenidium stellatum 
Hymenidium szechenyi 
Hymenidium tsekuense 
Hymenidium virgatum 
Hymenidium wilsonii 
Hymenidium wrightianum 
Hymenidium yunnanense

References

Apioideae
Apioideae genera